Amayannoor is a village in Kottayam district in the Indian state of Kerala. Administratively, it falls under Ayarkkunnam panchayath. It is located about 1.7 km from Ayarkkunnam, 4.6 km from Manarcaud and 8.1 km from Kidangoor.

Etymology 
Etymologically, the name Amayannoor derived from 'Abhimanyupuram' which literally means the land of Abhimanyu, son of Arjuna.

Legend 
According to the legends, Pandavas came here during their twelve years of exile and Abhimanyu consecrated a Shivalinga idol there. After a long time, a Pulaya woman who came to collect wood found a Lingam. Thekkumkur raja acknowledged by this construed a shrine for Lord Shiva there.

One day, the queen came to visit the temple. She was deeply amused by the shining 'Manikya' (Ruby gemstone) in the Linga idol. She made a request to the Ooranmas (temple administrators) to own the precious stone. But upon the denial, rani with her royal powers ordered the soldiers to take the stone. They killed the chief priest and took it from the Sreekovil. From there onwards, her dynasty was haunted by certain catastrophic and unfortunate events and even led to the destruction of the village. On Malayalam month Dhanu 23, the temple faced a conflagration. In , the temple and its complete assets were given to a person named 'Thiruvarppu Madappuram Swamiyar'. At present, the temple have daily poojas and annual festivities.

Main landmarks 
 Sri Mahadeva temple
 Amayannoor High School

Geography 

Thiruvanchoor , Ayarkunnam and Neericadu are the nearest villages of Amayannoor.

References

Villages in Kottayam district